Centerville is an unincorporated community in Gwinnett County, Georgia, United States.  Centerville is located south of Snellville and is situated around the intersections of State Routes 124 and 264. A part of Rockdale County may also be considered to be in Centerville.

History
A post office was in operation at Centerville from 1878 until 1903. An early variant name was "Sneezer".

Education
The Centerville area is served by Gwinnett County Public Schools.

The area has the Centerville Branch of the Gwinnett County Public Library system, which shares a building with the Centerville Community Center and the Snellville Branch that is neighbor to Thomas W. Briscoe Park in Snellville.

References

Unincorporated communities in Georgia (U.S. state)
Unincorporated communities in Gwinnett County, Georgia